A short-range device (SRD), described by ECC Recommendation 70-03, is a radio-frequency transmitter device used in telecommunication for the transmission of information, which has low capability of causing harmful interference to other radio equipment.

Short-range devices are low-power transmitters typically limited to 25–100 mW effective radiated power (ERP) or less, depending on the frequency band, which limits their useful range to few hundred meters, and do not require a license from their users.

Short-range wireless technologies include Bluetooth, Wi-Fi, near-field communication (NFC),  LPWAN, ultra-wideband (UWB) and IEEE 802.15.4. They are implemented by chips fabricated as RF CMOS integrated circuit (RF circuit). , short-range wireless chips ship approximately billion units annually, with Bluetooth accounting for over 55% of shipments and Wi-Fi around 35% of shipments.

Applications for short-range wireless devices include power meters and other remote instrumentation, RFID applications, radio-controlled models, fire, security and social alarms, vehicle radars, wireless microphones and earphones, traffic signs and signals (including control signals), remote garage door openers and car keys, barcode readers, motion detection, and many others.

The European Commission mandates through CEPT and ETSI the allocation of several device bands for these purposes, restricts the parameters of their use, and provides guidelines for avoiding radio interference.

Frequency bands
According to ECC Rec. 70-03, there are several annexes which encapsulate specific usage patterns, maximum emission power and duty cycle requirements.

SRD860
In Europe, 863 to 870  MHz band has been allocated for license-free operation using FHSS, DSSS, or analog modulation with either a transmission duty cycle of 0.1%, 1% or 10% depending on the band, or Listen Before Talk (LBT) with Adaptive Frequency Agility (AFA). Although this band falls under the Short Range Device umbrella, it is being used in Low-Power Wide-Area Network (LPWAN) wireless telecommunication networks, designed to allow long-range communications at a low bit rate among things (connected objects).

(* = as of 1 January 2018)

, unrestricted voice communications are allowed in the 869.7-870.0 MHz band with channel spacing of 25 kHz or less and maximum power output of 5 mW ERP.

SRD860 handheld transceivers were briefly available in mid 2000s, however they did not offer dual-band compatibility with PMR446 and LPD433 bands. , they have been put off-market.

From January 2018, the four RFID frequencies are also available for data networks, with a power up to 500 mW and a bandwidth of 200 kHz. The center frequencies are: 865.7, 866.3, 866.9 and 867.5 MHz. Specific restrictions on usage apply, such as a low duty cycle, LBT (listen before transmit) and APC (adaptive power control).

See also
 DASH7

References

External links
 
 
 
 

Radio electronics